Sergei Sokolov (born 12 March 1977) is a retired naturalized Azerbaijani football player.

International career
Sokolov was invited by Shahin Diniyev to play for Azerbaijan, which Sokolov earned 4 caps in Euro 2008 qualifying, before tested positive after the match against Belgium, 11 October 2006.

Sokolov was banned from football for 18 months in January 2007, after testing positive for betamethasone.

References

External links
 
 
 
 Player's profile

1977 births
Living people
Russian footballers
Azerbaijani footballers
Azerbaijan international footballers
Sportspeople from Stavropol
Russian emigrants to Azerbaijan
Association football defenders
Doping cases in association football
Azerbaijani sportspeople in doping cases
Azerbaijan Premier League players
FC Okean Nakhodka players
Simurq PIK players
Gabala FC players
Qarabağ FK players
FC Dynamo Stavropol players